Irina Viktorovna Belykh (born 16 August 1964) is a Russian politician from United Russia. She has been the member of the State Duma for the Khovrino constituency since 2016.

Education 
She graduated from the Sholokhov Moscow State University for Humanities and Synergy University.

References 

Living people
1964 births
21st-century Russian women politicians
United Russia politicians

Sixth convocation members of the State Duma (Russian Federation)
Seventh convocation members of the State Duma (Russian Federation)
Eighth convocation members of the State Duma (Russian Federation)
Politicians from Moscow
Moscow State Pedagogical University alumni